The Information Technology Act, 2000 (also known as ITA-2000, or the IT Act) is an Act of the Indian Parliament (No 21 of 2000) notified on 17 October 2000. It is the primary law in India dealing with cybercrime and electronic commerce.

Secondary or subordinate legislation to the IT Act includes the Intermediary Guidelines Rules 2011 and the Information Technology (Intermediary Guidelines and Digital Media Ethics Code) Rules, 2021.

Background
The bill was passed in the budget session of 2000 and signed by President K. R. Narayanan on 9 May 2000. The bill was finalised  by a group of officials headed by the Minister of Information Technology Pramod Mahajan.

Summary
The original Act contained 94 sections, divided into 13 chapters and 4 schedules. The laws apply to the whole of India. If a crime involves a computer or network located in India, persons of other nationalities can also be indicted under the law, .

The Act provides a legal framework for electronic governance by giving recognition to electronic records and digital signatures. It also defines cyber crimes and prescribes penalties for them. The Act directed the formation of a Controller of Certifying Authorities to regulate the issuance of digital signatures. It also established a Cyber Appellate Tribunal to resolve disputes rising from this new law. The Act also amended various sections of the Indian Penal Code, 1860, the Indian Evidence Act, 1872, the Banker's Book Evidence Act, 1891, and the Reserve Bank of India Act, 1934 to make them compliant with new technologies.

Amendments 
A major amendment was made in 2008. It introduced Section 66A which penalized sending "offensive messages". It also introduced Section 69, which gave authorities the power of "interception or monitoring or decryption of any information through any computer resource". Additionally, it introduced provisions addressing - pornography, child porn, cyber terrorism and voyeurism. The amendment was passed on 22 December 2008 without any debate in Lok Sabha. The next day it was passed by the Rajya Sabha. It was signed into law by President Pratibha Patil, on 5 February 2009.

Offences

List of offences and the corresponding penalties:

Notable cases

Section 66
 In February 2001, in one of the first cases, the Delhi police arrested two men running a web-hosting company. The company had shut down a website over non-payment of dues. The owner of the site had claimed that he had already paid and complained to the police. The Delhi police had charged the men for hacking under Section 66 of the IT Act and breach of trust under Section 408 of the Indian Penal Code. The two men had to spend 6 days in Tihar jail waiting for bail. 
 In February 2017, A Delhi based Ecommerce Portal made a Complaint with Hauz Khas Police Station against some hackers from different cities accusing them for IT Act / Theft / Cheating / Misappropriation / Criminal Conspiracy / Criminal Breach of Trust / Cyber Crime of Hacking / Snooping / Tampering with Computer source documents and the Web Site and extending the threats of dire consequences to employees, as a result four hackers were arrested by South Delhi Police for Digital Shoplifting.

Section 66A
 In September 2012, a freelance cartoonist Aseem Trivedi was arrested under the Section 66A of the IT Act, Section 2 of Prevention of Insults to National Honour Act, 1971 and for sedition under the Section 124 of the Indian Penal Code. His cartoons depicting widespread corruption in India were considered offensive.
 On 12 April 2012, a Chemistry professor from Jadavpur University, Ambikesh Mahapatra, was arrested for sharing a cartoon of West Bengal Chief Minister Mamata Banerjee and then Railway Minister Mukul Roy. The email was sent from the email address of a housing society. Subrata Sengupta, the secretary of the housing society, was also arrested. They were charged under Section 66A and B of the IT Act, for defamation under Sections 500, for obscene gesture to a woman under Section 509, and abetting a crime under Section 114 of the Indian Penal Code.
 On 30 October 2012, a Puducherry businessman Ravi Srinivasan was arrested under Section 66A. He had sent tweet accusing Karti Chidambaram, son of then Finance Minister P. Chidambaram, of corruption. Karti Chidambaram had complained to the police.
 On 19 November 2012, a 21-year-old girl was arrested from Palghar for posting a message on Facebook criticising the shutdown in Mumbai for the funeral of Bal Thackeray. Another 20-year-old girl was arrested for "liking" the post. They were initially charged under Section 295A of the Indian Penal Code (hurting religious sentiments) and Section 66A of the IT Act. Later, Section 295A was replaced by Section 505(2) (promoting enmity between classes). A group of Shiv Sena workers vandalised a hospital run by the uncle of one of girls. On 31 January 2013, a local court dropped all charges against the girls.
 On 18 March 2015, a teenaged boy was arrested from Bareilly, Uttar Pradesh, for making a post on Facebook insulting politician Azam Khan. The post allegedly contained hate speech against a community and was falsely attributed to Azam Khan by the boy. He was charged under Section 66A of the IT Act, and  Sections 153A (promoting enmity between different religions), 504 (intentional insult with intent to provoke breach of peace) and 505 (public mischief) of Indian Penal Code. After the Section 66A was repealed on 24 March, the state government said that they would continue the prosecution under the remaining charges.

Section 69A 

 On 29 June 2020, the Indian Government banned 59 Chinese mobile apps, most notably TikTok, supported by Section 69A and citing national security interests.
 On 24 November 2020, another 43 Chinese mobile apps were banned supported by the same reasoning, most notably AliExpress.
 54 more apps including popular video game Garena Free Fire were banned on 14 February 2022 under the same section.

Criticisms

Section 66A  and restriction of free speech
From its establishment as an amendment to the original act in 2008, Section 66A attracted controversy over its unconstitutional nature:

In December 2012, P Rajeev, a Rajya Sabha member from Kerala, tried to pass a resolution seeking to amend the Section 66A. He was supported by D. Bandyopadhyay, Gyan Prakash Pilania, Basavaraj Patil Sedam, Narendra Kumar Kashyap, Rama Chandra Khuntia and Baishnab Charan Parida. P Rajeev pointed that cartoons and editorials allowed in traditional media, were being censored in the new media. He also said that law was barely debated before being passed in December 2008.

Rajeev Chandrasekhar suggested the 66A should only apply to person to person communication pointing to a similar section under the Indian Post Office Act, 1898. Shantaram Naik opposed any changes, saying that the misuse of law was sufficient to warrant changes. The then Minister for Communications and Information Technology, Mr Kapil Sibal defended the existing law, saying that similar laws existed in US and UK. He also said that a similar provision existed under Indian Post Office Act, 1898. However, P Rajeev said that the UK dealt only with communication from person to person.

Petitions challenging constitutionality

In November 2012, IPS officer Amitabh Thakur and his wife social activist Nutan Thakur, filed a petition in the Lucknow bench of the Allahabad High Court claiming that the Section 66A violated the freedom of speech guaranteed in the Article 19(1)(a) of the Constitution of India. They said that the section was vague and frequently misused.

Also in November 2012, a Delhi-based law student, Shreya Singhal, filed a Public Interest Litigation (PIL) in the Supreme Court of India. She argued that the Section 66A was vaguely phrased, as result it violated Article 14, 19 (1)(a) and Article 21 of the Constitution. The PIL was accepted on 29 November 2012.

In August 2014, the Supreme Court asked the central government to respond to petitions filed by the Internet and Mobile Association of India (IAMAI) which claimed that the IT Act gave the government power to arbitrarily remove user-generated content.

Revocation by the Supreme Court

On 24 March 2015, the Supreme Court of India, gave the verdict that Section 66A is unconstitutional in entirety. The court said that Section 66A of IT Act 2000 is "arbitrarily, excessively and disproportionately invades the right of free speech" provided under Article 19(1) of the Constitution of India. But the Court turned down a plea to strike down sections 69A and 79 of the Act, which deal with the procedure and safeguards for blocking certain websites. Despite this, as per a research paper by Abhinav Sekhri and Apar Gupta Section 66A of the Information Technology Act 2000, continues to be used by police departments across India in prosecutions.

Strict data privacy rules
The data privacy rules introduced in the Act in 2011 have been described as too strict by some Indian and US firms. The rules require firms to obtain written permission from customers before collecting and using their personal data. This has affected US firms which outsource to Indian companies. However, some companies have welcomed the strict rules, saying it will remove fears of outsourcing to Indian companies.

Section 69 and mandatory decryption

The Section 69 allows intercepting any information and ask for information decryption. To refuse decryption is an offence. The Indian Telegraph Act, 1885 allows the government to tap phones. But, according to a 1996 Supreme Court verdict the government can tap phones only in case of a "public emergency". But, there is no such restriction on Section 69. On 20 December 2018, the Ministry of Home Affairs cited Section 69 in the issue of an order authorising ten central agencies to intercept, monitor, and decrypt “any information generated, transmitted, received or stored in any computer.”  While some claim this to be a violation of the fundamental right to privacy, the Ministry of Home Affairs has claimed its validity on the grounds of national security.

Section 69A and banning of mobile apps 
The bans on Chinese apps based on Section 69A has been criticized for possibly being in conflict with Article 19(1)(a) of the Constitution of India ensuring freedom of speech and expression to all, as well as possibly in conflict with WTO agreements. The Internet Freedom Foundation has criticized the ban for not following the required protocols and thus lacking transparency and disclosure.

Future changes
On 2 April 2015, the Chief Minister of Maharashtra, Devendra Fadnavis revealed to the state assembly that a new law was being framed to replace the repealed Section 66A. Fadnavis was replying to a query Shiv Sena leader Neelam Gorhe. Gorhe had said that repeal of the law would encourage online miscreants and asked whether the state government would frame a law to this regard. Fadnavis said that the previous law had resulted in no convictions, so the law would be framed such that it would be strong and result in convictions.

On 13 April 2015, it announced that the Ministry of Home Affairs would form a committee of officials from the Intelligence Bureau, Central Bureau of Investigation, National Investigation Agency, Delhi Police and ministry itself to produce a new legal framework. This step was reportedly taken after complaints from intelligence agencies that, they were no longer able to counter online posts that involved national security matter or incite people to commit an offence, such as online recruitment for ISIS. Former Minister of State with the Ministry of Information Technology, Milind Deora has supported a new "unambiguous section to replace 66A".

In 2022, it was reported of a proposal to replace the Information Technology Act with a more comprehensive and updated Digital India Act, which would cover a wider range of information technology issues and concerns. This law could ostensibly have focal areas around privacy, social media regulation, regulation of over-the-top platforms, internet intermediaries, introducing additional contraventions or offences and governance of new technologies.

Importance of the Information Technology Act
The Indian government closely connects data to citizens' privacy and this is demonstrated when Shiv Shankar Singh states, "Each person must be able to exercise a substantial degree of control over that data and its use.  Data protection is legal safeguard to prevent misuse of information about individual person on a medium including computers."

Secondary legislation 
The Information Technology (Intermediary Guidelines and Digital Media Ethics Code) Rules, 2021 suppresses India's Intermediary Guidelines Rules 2011.

See also
 Personal Data Protection Bill 2019
 Chilling effect
 Mouthshut.com v. Union of India
 Save Your Voice

References

Further reading

External links
 

Computing legislation
Acts of the Parliament of India 2000
2000 in India
2000 in law
Vajpayee administration
Information technology in India
Censorship in India
Internet in India
Manmohan Singh administration
2008 in India
2008 in law
Medical privacy legislation
Cyber Security in India